Calopteryx aequabilis, the river jewelwing, is a species of broad-winged damselfly. The species was first described by Thomas Say in 1839. It is one out of the 170 species of the Odonata found from northeastern Alberta to Newfoundland and south in most of the United States.

Description
The male has a metallic blue-green body and black wing tips. The female is duller brown with smoky wing tips that have white spots near the tips. The naiad is pale brown with darker markings.

Habitat
It lives near small to moderate forest streams.

References

Calopterygidae
Odonata of North America
Insects of Canada
Insects of the United States
Insects described in 1839
Taxa named by Thomas Say